The 2012 CSIO Schweiz (English: CSIO Switzerland) was the 2012 edition of the CSIO Schweiz, the Swiss official show jumping horse show, at Gründenmoos in St. Gallen. It was held as CSIO 5*.

The first horse show were held 1884 at St. Gallen. Up to the 1970s the CSIO Schweiz was held on year in Geneva and the next year in Lucerne. In the next years, up to 2006, the CSIO Schweiz was held one year in St. Gallen and in the outer year in Lucerne. Since 2007 each year the CSIO Schweiz are held in St. Gallen.

The 2012 edition of the CSIO Schweiz was held between May 31, 2012 and June 3, 2012.

FEI Nations Cup of Switzerland 
The 2012 FEI Nations Cup of Switzerland was part of the 2012 CSIO Schweiz. It was the third competition of the 2012 FEI Nations Cup and was held at Friday, June 1, 2012 at 2:45 pm. The competing teams were: the Netherlands, Germany, the Switzerland, Belgium, France, Great Britain, Sweden and Ireland.

The competition was a show jumping competition with two rounds and optionally one jump-off. The height of the fences were up to 1.60 meters. All teams were allowed to start in the second round. The competition is endowed with 200,000 €.

(grey penalties points do not count for the team result)

Grosses Jagdspringen 
The “Grosses Jagdspringen” was the biggest competition on Saturday at the 2011 CSIO Schweiz. The sponsor of this competition was Mercedes Benz Switzerland. It was held at Saturday, June 2, 2012 at 1:00 pm. 

The competition was a speed and handiness show jumping competition (faults at fences will be converted into seconds; this seconds will be added to the time of the competitor). The height of the fences was up to 1.45 meters. It was endowed with 80,000 CHF.

Longines Grand Prix 
The Longines Grand Prix was the major competition of the 2011 CSIO Schweiz. The sponsor of this competition is Longines. It will be held at Sunday, June 3, 2011 at 2:30 pm. 

The competition was a show jumping competition with two rounds, the height of the fences will be up to 1.60 meters. It is endowed with 200,000 €. Ten years after his victory with For Pleasure German rider Marcus Ehning win again the Grand Prix of St. Gallen.

External links 
 official website
 2012 results

References 

CSIO Schweiz
CSIO Schweiz
CSIO Schweiz